Julie Murphy is the name of:

 Julie Murphy (author), an American author
 Julie Murphy (singer) (born 1961), a Welsh singer